Taslimi (Persian: سوسن تسلیمی) is a surname of Iranian origin. Notable people with the surname include:

 Manouchehr Taslimi (1923−1998), Iranian Professor and Member of Government.
 Reza Taslimi, Iranian intelligence officer involved in assassinations of political dissidents.
 Susan Taslimi (born 1950) is an Iranian actress, film director, theatre director, and screenwriter.

Persian-language surnames